Ghindăoani is a commune in Neamț County, Western Moldavia, Romania. It is composed of a single village, Ghindăoani. This was part of Bălțătești Commune until 2003, when it was split off.

References

Communes in Neamț County
Localities in Western Moldavia